Aminou Bouba (born 28 January 1991) is a Cameroonian professional footballer who plays as a defender for Gokulam Kerala in the I-League.

Club career

Earlier career
Bouba began his club football career at Cameroonian side Coton FC de Garouain 2012. After playing there for three years, Bouba moved to Tunisian club Espérance Sportive de Tunis. He later moved to Algerian league outfit CS Constantine, and later played for multiple Saudi Professional League clubs – Al-Khaleej, Al-Ettifaq, and Al-Tai. With Khaleej, he scored 4 goals in 24 league matches. He then moved back to his country and appeared with Bandjoun.

In 2019, he signed with Guinean Ligue 1 Pro side Horoya.

Gokulam Kerala
On 26 August 2021, it was announced that defending I-League champions Gokulam Kerala have completed the signing of Bouba.

Bouba made his debut for the club in the 2021 Durand Cup, on 12 September 2021, against Army Red, which ended in a 2–2 draw. On 26 December 2021, he made his I-League debut against Churchill Brothers, which ended in a narrow 1–0 win.

On 5 April 2022, he scored his first goal for the club against Sreenidi Deccan, in a 2–1 win, through a header. After back to back wins in both the group and championship stages, Gokulam Kerala clinched I-League in 2021–22 season, defeating Mohammedan Sporting 2–1 in the final game at the Salt Lake Stadium on 14 May, and became the first club in fifteen years to defend the title. Bouba captained his side in the final match.

At the 2022 AFC Cup group-stage opener, Bouba and his side achieved a historic 4–2 win against Indian Super League side ATK Mohun Bagan. Later, they were defeated 1–0 by Maldivian side Maziya S&RC, and 1–2 by Bashundhara Kings of Bangladesh respectively, and knocked out of the tournament.

International career
Bouba made his senior international debut for Cameroon on 16 November 2012 against Indonesia in their 0–0 draw.

Career statistics

Club

International

International goals
Scores and results list Cameroon's goal tally first

Honours
Coton
 Elite One: 2013
Espérance Tunis
 Tunisian Ligue Professionnelle 1: 2013–14
Horoya
 Guinée Championnat National: 2018–19
Gokulam Kerala
 I-League: 2021–22Individual'''
I-League best defender of the season: 2021–22

Reference:

References

External links 
 
 Aminou Bouba at Footballdatabase

1991 births
Living people
Cameroonian footballers
Association football defenders
Expatriate footballers in Saudi Arabia
Coton Sport FC de Garoua players
Espérance Sportive de Tunis players
CS Constantine players
Khaleej FC players
Ettifaq FC players
Al-Tai FC players
Horoya AC players
Cameroonian expatriate sportspeople in Saudi Arabia
Saudi Professional League players
Saudi First Division League players
Gokulam Kerala FC players